BoBoiBoy is a Malaysian animated series produced by Animonsta Studios, centres on a boy who has elemental superpowers and is able to separate into three. With his friends, Ying, Hanna (Yaya in the Malay version) and Gopal, they fight to protect the earth from alien threats to conquer the Earth to hunt down cocoa beans.

Series overview

Episode list

Season 1 (2011–12)

Season 2 (2012–13)

Season 3 (2014–16)

References

Lists of Malaysian animated television series episodes